For the paranormal investigator, see Ryan Buell.

Ryan W. Buell is an American academic. He is the UPS Foundation Associate Professor of Service Management at the Harvard Business School. He has published research on economic redistribution and service management.

References

Living people
Ross School of Business alumni
Harvard Business School alumni
Harvard Business School faculty
Year of birth missing (living people)